The 2022 Georgia Secretary of State election was held on November 8, 2022, to elect the Secretary of State of Georgia. Incumbent Republican Secretary of State Brad Raffensperger won re-election to a second term. Raffensperger emerged as a major national figure in late 2020 when he faced significant pressure from President Donald Trump to overturn the 2020 presidential election in Georgia. The party primary elections took place on May 24, with runoffs scheduled for June 21.

Raffensperger was elected in 2018 to a first term in a runoff against Democratic former U.S. representative John Barrow, the first time in Georgia history that any statewide executive election went to a second round.

Republican primary

Candidates

Nominee
 Brad Raffensperger, incumbent Secretary of State

Eliminated in primary
 David Belle Isle, former mayor of Alpharetta and candidate for Secretary of State in 2018
 Jody Hice, U.S. Representative for 
 TJ Hudson, former Treutlen County Probate Judge

Endorsements

Debates

Polling
Graphical summary

Results

Despite opinion polls suggesting a tight race between Brad Raffensperger and Jody Hice as well as Trump's endorsement of Hice, Raffensperger ultimately won the primary election with a 19 point margin over Hice and avoided a potential runoff by winning an outright majority of the vote. This has been attributed to Hice's insufficient name recognition across the state and crossover voting in Georgia's open primary system where some Democratic voters voted in the Republican primary to vote against "Trump-backed extremists" like Hice.

The only county to not be won by either Raffensperger or Hice is Treutlen County, Hudson's home county, which he won with 76.42% of the vote.

Democratic primary

Candidates

Nominee
Bee Nguyen, state representative

Eliminated in runoff
Dee Dawkins-Haigler, former state representative and candidate for Secretary of State in 2018

Eliminated in initial primary
 John Eaves, former chair of the Fulton County Commission and candidate for Georgia's 7th congressional district in 2020
Floyd Griffin, former state senator and former mayor of Milledgeville
Michael Owens, former chair of the Cobb County Democratic Party, U.S. Marine Corps veteran and cybersecurity executive

Did not file
Manswell Peterson, former college professor

Endorsements

First round

Debates

Polling

Results

Runoff

Results

Libertarian primary

Candidates

Declared
Ted Metz, former chair of the Libertarian Party of Georgia and nominee for governor in 2018

General election

Predictions

Endorsements

Polling 
Graphical summary

Results

Notes

References

External links
Official campaign websites
Ted Metz (L) for Secretary of State
Bee Nguyen (D) for Secretary of State
Brad Raffensperger (R) for Secretary of State

Georgia
Secretary of State